Tavadi ("prince", lit. "head/chief" [man], from  tavi, "head", with the prefix of agent -di) was a feudal title in Georgia first applied in the Late Middle Ages usually translated in English as Prince (most commonly) and Duke (less commonly). The title was designated for dynastic princes who were heads of families, akin to mtavari who had a higher standing.

The tavadis were subordinates and vassals of the kings, queens, mtavaris and batonishvilis  but had administrative, judicial and tax immunities in their dominions and had their own military forces. The lower noble feudal class of Georgia had the title of aznauri who were subordinates of tavadis.

See also
List of Georgian princely families
Court officials of the Kingdom of Georgia

References
Jamburia G. Georgian Soviet Encyclopedia, Volume 4, p. 561-562, Tbilisi, 1979

Social history of Georgia (country)
Nobility of Georgia (country)
Noble titles of Georgia (country)
Titles
Georgian words and phrases